Judge Jacob George Klock (1738–1814) was a judge, member of the assembly, and state senator for New York State.

He was born March 9, 1738, in Albany County, New York, the son of George Klock.

In 1777, he was a judge for Tryon County. He represented Tryon County in the New York State Assembly from September 1777 to 1778, and was a member of the New York State Senate from the western district from 1778 to 1785. He was on the New York State committee of forfeiture from 1779 to 1788.  He was a judge of Montgomery County from 1778 to 1787.

He died September 8, 1814.

Footnotes

References
 Nellis, Milo, The Mohawk Dutch and the Palatines, 1951, ASIN B0007EPVYO
 Jones, Thomas, History of New York during the Revolutionary War, 1879
 The minute book of the Committee of Safety of Tryon County, 1905
 Minutes of the Committee and of the First Commission for Detecting and Defeating Conspiracies in the State of New York
 The Political Graveyard, 

Members of the New York State Assembly
People of the Province of New York
1738 births
1814 deaths